Christopher Stephens (born ) is a Welsh rugby union player who earned two caps for the national team. He is also known for an on-the-pitch incident in which he punched opposition player Ioan Bebb. He was fined after admitting grievous bodily harm; Bebb's career was ended. Stephens also punched Charles Riechelmann in a later match.

References

1975 births
Living people
Welsh rugby union players
Wales international rugby union players